Kosmos 191 ( meaning Cosmos 191), also known as DS-P1-Yu No.9 was a Soviet satellite which was used as a radar calibration target for tests of anti-ballistic missiles. It was built by the Yuzhnoye Design Office, and launched in 1967 as part of the Dnepropetrovsk Sputnik programme.

A Kosmos-2I 63SM carrier rocket was used to launch Kosmos 191 from Site 133/3 at Plesetsk Cosmodrome. The launch occurred at 14:29:48 GMT on 21 November 1967, and resulted in Kosmos 191's successful deployment into low Earth orbit. Upon reaching orbit, it was assigned its Kosmos designation, and received the International Designator 1967-115A.

It was a  spacecraft. It remained in orbit until it decayed and reentered the atmosphere on 2 March 1968. It was the eleventh of seventy nine DS-P1-Yu satellites to be launched, and the tenth of seventy two to successfully reach orbit.

See also

 1967 in spaceflight

References

Spacecraft launched in 1967
Kosmos 0191
1967 in the Soviet Union
Dnepropetrovsk Sputnik program